Jackpot is a 2018 Pakistani romantic comedy film, directed by Shoaib Khan and produced by Khurram Riaz. The script has been written by Babar Kashmiri, and the cinematography has been done by Anubhay Bansal. The film's leading cast includes Sanam Chaudhry, Noor Hassan Rizvi, Sana Fakhar, Adnan Shah Tipu, Inayat Khan and Javed Sheikh. Celebrities, including Mehmood Aslam, Afzal Khan, Zara Sheikh, Ismail Tara and Meera made cameo appearances in the film.

Cast

Main 
 Noor Hassan Rizvi as Lucky
 Sanam Chaudhry as Chandni
 Adnan Shah Tipu
 Inayat Khan as Sameer
 Sana Fakhar
 Iftikhar Thakur
 Javed Sheikh as Jojo
 Sajan Abbas
Shoaib Khan as Director

Cameo appearances
 Zara Sheikh
 Ismail Tara
 Meera
 Afzal Khan Rambo
 Mehmood Aslam
 Saba Faisal

Release
The film was released on 6 July 2018 but due to stiff competition from other film releases it was pulled off cinema screens. The film was re-released in cinemas on 11 January 2019.

Box office
The film received mixed reviews from viewers and open with very low opening collection just (0.13 crore) on its first day. The film collet its first week (1.25 crore) that was much low. Its total box office collection was (3.25 crore) and the film declared disaster of the year.

Soundtrack

See also
List of Pakistani films of 2018

References

External links
 

2018 films
2010s Urdu-language films
Pakistani romantic comedy films
2018 romantic comedy films